National Route 433 is a national highway of Japan connecting Ōtake, Hiroshima and Miyoshi, Hiroshima in Japan, with a total length of 130.5 km (81.09 mi).

References

National highways in Japan
Roads in Hiroshima Prefecture